Eunice Nana Akosua Konadu, also known as Nana Akosua Konadu, is a Ghanaian broadcaster, CEO and founder of Enak Consult. She is the host of The Hard Truth on the Joy News channel on Multi TV.

Education 
Nana Akosua Konadu attended Pentecost University College Ghana from 2006 to 2010 where she graduated with a Bachelor of Science Degree in Human resource management. She also attended Yaa Asantewaa Senior High School for her secondary education.

Career 
After completing her University education she did her one-year mandatory National Service at the National Disaster Management Organization (NADMO) as a human resource officer. After her national service she is the producer and host of current affairs show The Hard Truth on Viasat 1 which has now moved to Joy News. She co-hosted the AM Show on the Joy News channel on Multi TV in Ghana. She is the current CEO of Enak Studios an events and production management company.

Personal life
Nana Akossua Konadu married Manuel Asante-Samuels on Saturday 14 May 2016 at the Pentecost International Worship Centre Kokomlemle.

References 

Living people
Ghanaian journalists
Year of birth missing (living people)
Ghanaian Pentecostals
Yaa Asantewaa Girls' Senior High School alumni